Romanian Australians may include those who have immigrated to Australia from Romania, and Australian-born citizens of Romanian descent. According to ABS (2021 census) figures, there are 28,103 people with Romanian ancestry in Australia.

Romanians were registered in Australia for the first time more than 80 years ago having emigrated for work seeking a more prosperous economic status, or as missionaries. But the first wave of Romanian emigrants to Australia came after World War II, when Romania was experiencing severe economic and political problems. The Romanians who were then emigrating to Australia principally settled in areas around Sydney, Melbourne and Brisbane. The number of Romanians who came to Australia at the time is estimated to be around 2,000 people.

The second wave of Romanian emigration to the Australian continent began after the Romanian Revolution of 1989, when the Communist regime fell and citizens received the right to leave Romania. They came in large numbers for the same reasons as the first-wave immigrants.

Demographics

 the largest communities of Romanian-Australians could be found in Melbourne (6,482), Sydney (4,145)and Brisbane (1,912).

In the 2006 Census, among Romanian-born persons, the religious breakdown was as follows: 80.6% Christianity, 5.8% no religion or atheism, 4.4% Judaism, 3.0% other religions and 5.6% did not answer the question.

A small number of Romanian Australians are ethnic Greeks. They founded the Greeks from Romania NSW Association "The Acropolis" based in Sydney.

Notable Romanian Australians

 Victor Albert Bailey, physicist  (his mother was Romanian)
 Traian Chirilă, chemist
 Carin Clonda, squash player 
 Greg Conescu, rugby league footballer
 Daniela Costian, Olympic bronze medalist;
 Andrew Ilie, tennis player
 Daniel Ioniță, poet
 Lucy Kiraly, model and television presenter
 Ted Theodore, 12th Treasurer of Australia (his father was Romanian)
 Anthony Fisher, prelate, Archbishop of Sydney
 Hagi Gligor, footballer
 Raimond Gaita, philosopher and writer (his father was Romanian)
 Daniela Nuțu-Gajić, chess player
 Ajdin Hrustic, footballer
 Elsa Pataky, actress
 Lance Picioane, Australian rules footballer
 Ion Popa, rower
 Rosemary Popa, rower
 Julian Savulescu, philosopher and bioethicist
 Lauren Mitchell, artistic gymnast
 Mirka Mora, prominent artist (her mother was Romanian)
 Aida Tomescu, artist
 Xonia, singer
 Edmond Lupancu, footballer

See also
 Demographics of Australia
 European Australians
 Europeans in Oceania
 Immigration to Australia
 Australia–Romania relations

References 

European Australian
Romanian diaspora
Main